The grey ground thrush (Geokichla princei) is a species of bird in the family Turdidae.

Distribution and habitat
It is found in Cameroon, Democratic Republic of the Congo, Gabon, Ghana, Ivory Coast, Liberia, Sierra Leone, and Uganda. Its natural habitat is subtropical or tropical moist lowland forests.

References

Geokichla
Birds of Central Africa
Birds of West Africa
Birds described in 1873
Taxonomy articles created by Polbot